2,4-Dinitrotoluene (DNT) or dinitro is an organic compound with the formula C7H6N2O4. This pale yellow crystalline solid is well known as a precursor to trinitrotoluene (TNT) but is mainly produced as a precursor to toluene diisocyanate.

Isomers of dinitrotoluene
Six positional isomers are possible for dinitrotoluene. The most common one is 2,4-dinitrotoluene. The nitration of toluene gives sequentially mononitrotoluene, DNT, and finally TNT. 2,4-DNT is the principal product from dinitration, the other main product being about 30% 1,3-DN2-T. The nitration of 4-nitrotoluene gives 2,4-DNT.

Applications
Most DNT is used in the production of toluene diisocyanate, which is used to produce flexible polyurethane foams. DNT is hydrogenated to produce 2,4-toluenediamine, which in turn is phosgenated to give toluene diisocyanate. In this way, about 1.4 billion kilograms are produced annually, as of the years 1999–2000. Other uses include the explosives industry. It is not used by itself as an explosive, but some of the production is converted to TNT.

Dinitrotoluene is frequently used as a plasticizer, deterrent coating, and burn rate modifier in propellants (e.g., smokeless gunpowders). As it is carcinogenic and toxic, modern formulations tend to avoid its use. In this application it is often used together with dibutyl phthalate.

Toxicity
Dinitrotoluenes are highly toxic with a threshold limit value (TLV) of 1.5 mg/m3. It converts hemoglobin into methemoglobin.

2,4-Dinitrotoluene is also a listed hazardous waste under 40 CFR 261.24. Its United States Environmental Protection Agency (EPA) Hazardous Waste Number is D030. The maximum concentration that may be contained to not have toxic characteristics is 0.13 mg/L.

References

External links 
 

Explosive chemicals
IARC Group 2B carcinogens
Nitrotoluenes
Plasticizers